Uramustine (INN) or uracil mustard is a chemotherapy drug which belongs to the class of alkylating agents.  It is used in lymphatic malignancies such as non-Hodgkin's lymphoma. It works by damaging DNA, primarily in cancer cells that preferentially take up the uracil due to their need to make nucleic acids during their rapid cycles of cell division. The DNA damage leads to apoptosis of the affected cells. Bone marrow suppression and nausea are the main side effects.

Chemically it is a derivative of nitrogen mustard and uracil.

References

IARC Group 2B carcinogens
Nitrogen mustards
Pyrimidinediones
Organochlorides
Uracil derivatives
Chloroethyl compounds